is a 2012 Japanese film based on the manga of the same name, We Were There. It is directed by the director Takahiro Miki and stars Toma Ikuta, Yuriko Yoshitaka. The film was released in two parts, with the first released in Japanese cinemas in the spring of 2012. The second part was released 4–5 weeks after the first part.

Cast
 Toma Ikuta as Motoharu Yano
 Yuriko Yoshitaka as Nanami Takahashi
 Sosuke Takaoka as Masafumi Takeuchi
 Yuika Motokariya as Yuri Yamamoto
 Ayaka Komatsu as Nana

Production
Bokura ga Ita was first serialized in Betsucomi, and it won the 50th Shogakukan Manga Award for Shōjo manga. Director Takahiro Miki directed the film, and film produced by Tomoko Yoshida.

The main cast of Bokura ga Ita was revealed on 2 May 2011. Toma Ikuta, who previously starred in the films Hanamizuki and No Longer Human, would be starring in this film as Motoharu Yano, a boy who is popular with most girls in the class. Actress Yuriko Yoshitaka, the recipient of the Best Newcomer award at the 28th Yokohama Film Festival, would star as Nanami Takahashi, a classmate of Motoharu. In addition, Sosuke Takaoka would play the role of Masafumi Takeuchi, Yano's close friend, and Yuika Motokariya would play Yuri Yamamoto, the younger sister of Motoharu's late girlfriend.

The filming of Bokura ga Ita took place in Kushiro, Hokkaido. This is the hometown of Yuki Obata, the manga artist of Bokura ga Ita, the manga this film is based on. The filming began in May 2011. The film was filmed in Sapporo, Hokkaido and in Tokyo.

References

External links
  
 

2012 films
Japanese romantic drama films
Live-action films based on manga
Films directed by Takahiro Miki

ja:僕等がいた#映画